Sevier County Courthouse may refer to:

Sevier County Courthouse (Tennessee), listed on the National Register of Historic Places in Sevier County
Sevier County Courthouse (Utah), formerly listed on the National Register of Historic Places in Sevier County, Utah